Julago is a rural locality in the City of Townsville, Queensland, Australia. It will be the site of Townsville's largest masterplanned real estate development in the years ahead.

Geography 
The northern part of the locality is mountainous with the highest peak being Mount Muntalunga (228 metres) part of the Muntalunga Range and an unnamed peak (200 metres) and is mostly undeveloped bushland. Between these two mountains is a valley (40 meters above sea level). The Bruce Highway and the North Coast railway pass through the locality through this valley from the east to the north-west. Most of the housing in the locality is in this valley. The south part of the locality is used for grazing by the Rocky Springs station.

History 
The locality was named and bounded on 27 July 1991. The name comes from the Julago railway station, assigned by the Queensland Railways Department from 7 May 1942 (as part of a World War II emergency crossing loop). The name is reportedly an Aboriginal word, meaning plains turkey.

In November 2016, the Deputy Premier of Queensland, Jackie Trad, announced that Townsville's largest master-planned community would be built on the Rocky Springs Land in a new development called Elliot Springs. When completed in 2050 (estimated), the  estate will have over 10,600 homes and over 26,000 residents. Trad committed the Queensland Government to spend $15M on water and road infrastructure  as part of co-investment with property developer Lendlease. The name Elliot Springs reflects that Mount Elliot will be the backdrop to the new development, which will also have views of Mount Jack, Mount Stuart and the Muntalunga Ranges.

LendLease expect the first display village with homes constructed by 13 building companies will open in January 2019.

Education 
There are no schools in Julago. The nearest primary school is Wulguru State School in Wulguru to the north-west. The nearest secondary school is William Ross State High School in Annandale to the north-west.

Amenities 
Elliot Spring Wesleyan Methodist Church meets at the Elliot Springs Community Centre on Elliot Springs Boulevard (approx ). It is part of the Wesleyan Methodist Church.

References 

City of Townsville
Localities in Queensland